Basudeb Acharia (born 11 July 1942) is an Indian politician and a leader of the Communist Party of India (Marxist) political party. His ancestors were originally from Present-day Tamil Nadu, who settled in Bengal in 16th Century. He considers himself to be a Bengali.

Early life 
The son of late Kanai Lal Acharia and Smt. Konak Lata Acharia, he was born at Bero in Purulia district. He now lives in Kantaranguni, P.O. Adra, in Purulia district. He holds a M.A. and B.T.

Early political life 
He was elected for the first time to the 7th Lok Sabha from Bankura constituency in 1980. 

He was a member of the Puruliya district committee of CPI(M). In 1981, he was inducted in the district secretariat of the CPI(M)'s Puruliya district committee.

Since 1985, he has been a member of the CPI(M) West Bengal State Committee.

Political career
He has been re-elected to the Lok Sabha repeatedly in 1989, 1991, 1996, 1998, 1999, 2004, and 2009. 

While in Lok Sabha he was associated with Committee on Railways, member, Rules Committee, General Purposes Committee, Committee on Security in Parliament Complex, and Committee on Installation of Portraits/Statues of National Leaders and Parliamentarian in Parliament House.

He has served as the chairman, Committee on Public Undertakings from 1990 to 1991.Between 1993 and 96 he was the chairman, Committee on Government Assurances. From 1990 to 1996 he was a member of the Consultative Committee, Ministry of Railways. 

In 1996–97 he was the chairman, Committee on Railways and a Member, Consultative Committee, Ministry of Industry. In 1998–99 he was the Convenor, Sub-Committee on Power, Committee on Energy and a Special Invitee, Consultative Committee, Ministry of Railways. Between 1999 and 2004 he was the chairman, Committee on Petitions.

He was elected as leader of the CPI (M) Parliamentary Party in the 14th Lok Sabha in 2004 after Somnath Chatterjee was elected as Lok Sabha Speaker. He was a member of several parliamentary committees. In 2007, he was made the chairman, Committee on Railways. 

In 2005, he was elected as a member of the Central Committee of the Communist Party of India (Marxist) from the 18th party congress held at New Delhi. He is also one of the All India Vice-presidents of the Centre of Indian Trade Unions.

In 2009, he was re-elected as the leader of the CPI (M) Parliamentary Party in the 15th Lok Sabha. Since August 2009, he has been serving as the chairman, Committee on Agriculture.

He has visited several nations as a parliamentarian.

He has been a senior trade union leader. He is one of the vice-presidents of the Centre of Indian Trade Unions, also of DVC Shramik Union, Colliery Mazdoor Sabha. He has been a member of the General Council of the CITU and its member of West Bengal State Working Committee. He is also the President of Purulia District CITU.

He is serving as a President of West Bengal Railway Contractor Labour Union, DVC Contractor Workers Union, LIC Agent Organisation of India, Thikadar Sramik Union (at Santaldih Thermal Power Station) and at Damodar Cement & Slag Workers Union.

He lost the 2014 Lok Sabha election to Moonmoon Sen of Trinamool Congress. 

During 2018 Panchayat elections he was attacked by the Trinamool Congress and was left bloodied and injured while leading a procession with candidates for filing nomination at Kashipur in Puruliya. 

He remained in the state committee till 2018 and in the central committee until 2022. Between 2018 and 2022, he was the chairman of CPI(M)'s central control commission. During 2018 to 2022, he was also made an invited member of CPI(M) state committee.

Personal life
He married Rajlakhsmi Acharia on February 25, 1975. The couple has one son and two daughters.

References

External links
 Official biographical sketch in Parliament of India website

1942 births
Living people
Communist Party of India (Marxist) politicians from West Bengal
Trade unionists from West Bengal
People from Purulia district
India MPs 2004–2009
India MPs 2009–2014
Ranchi University alumni
University of Calcutta alumni
India MPs 1980–1984
India MPs 1984–1989
India MPs 1989–1991
India MPs 1991–1996
India MPs 1996–1997
India MPs 1998–1999
India MPs 1999–2004
Lok Sabha members from West Bengal
People from Bankura
Communist Party of India (Marxist) candidates in the 2014 Indian general election